This is a list of Women's National Basketball Association players by total career regular season free throws made. Active players are in bold.

Statistics accurate as of the conclusion of September 13, 2020

External links
WNBA Career Leaders and Records for Free Throws | Basketball-Reference.com

Lists of Women's National Basketball Association players
Women's National Basketball Association statistics